Van Houten–Ackerman House may refer to:

Van Houten–Ackerman House (Franklin Lakes, New Jersey), NRHP-listed in Bergen County
Van Houten–Ackerman House (Wyckoff, New Jersey), NRHP-listed in Bergen County

See also
Ackerman House (disambiguation)